Carallia coriifolia is a tree of Borneo in the family Rhizophoraceae. The specific epithet  is from the Latin meaning "leathery leaf".

Description
Its flaky bark is dark grey.

Distribution and habitat
Carallia coriifolia is endemic to Borneo. Its habitat is dipterocarp forest from sea-level to  altitude.

References

coriifolia
Trees of Borneo
Endemic flora of Borneo
Plants described in 1938
Flora of the Borneo lowland rain forests